Meoni is an Italian surname. Notable people with this surname include:

 Fabrizio Meoni (1957–2005), Italian off-road and rallying motorcycle racer
 Giovanni Meoni, Italian operatic baritone
 Marco Meoni (born 1973), a volleyball player from Italy

Italian-language surnames